Megan Woznicki (born September 8, 1985), professionally known as Megan Massacre, is an American tattoo artist. She is best known for her appearances on the TLC reality television shows NY Ink and America's Worst Tattoos. She is the co-founder of Grit n Glory, a tattoo shop in New York City.

Biography
Megan Massacre was born Megan Woznicki in Philadelphia, Pennsylvania on September 8, 1985. She grew up with a passion for all forms of art. She became so good with a calligraphic pen that, in high school, she made money doing wedding invitations.

Her interest in tattooing began when she was 14 years old, but she had to wait a few years to start learning the technique because of her age and because she lacked the money to pay for classes. At age 18, she did her first tattoo piece. To make tattooing a full-time job, she quit her job at a furniture store. She bounced around from shop to shop to learn new styles, and once she felt confident enough, she would move on to another shop. A few years later, her tattoo work was published for the first time on a local magazine cover with her Megan Massacre nickname. In 2010, she got an offer to appear on the TLC reality television show NY Ink. She then also appeared on other tattoo-related shows Bondi Ink Tattoo and America's Worst Tattoos. In 2014, she opened a tattoo shop, Grit n Glory, in New York City. She has more than one million followers on Instagram and celebrity clients like Zayn Malik.

In 2021, Inked included her in its list of the "10 Female Artists Who've Changed the Tattoo Industry".

She is also an animal enthusiast, supporting the ASPCA and PETA and living a vegetarian lifestyle.

Filmography

Television

Books
 Marked in Ink (2016)
 The Art of Tattoo (2019)

References

External links
 Official website
 

1985 births
Living people
People from Philadelphia
Participants in American reality television series
American tattoo artists